Sachin ahir  (born 21 March 1972 in Mumbai, India) is an Indian politician from Mumbai, Maharashtra and Deputy Leader of the Shiv Sena. He is current member of Maharashtra Legislative Council. He was Member of the Legislative Assembly from Worli constituency.

Community service
Sachin and his wife have established the Shree Sankalp Pratishthan charitable trust. The trust has been involved in organisation of the Worli Festival and Dahi Handi events during the festival of Govinda.

Positions held
 1999: Elected to Maharashtra Legislative Assembly (1st term) 
 2004: Re-Elected to Maharashtra Legislative Assembly (2nd term)
 2009: Re-Elected to Maharashtra Legislative Assembly (3rd term) 
 2009: Appointed Minister of State for Housing in Maharashtra Government 
 2020 : Appointed Deputy Leader of Shiv Sena
 2022: Elected to Maharashtra Legislative Council (1st term)

With Trade Union
Sachin Ahir began his work with the Rashtriya Mill Mazdoor Sangh in 1993. After holding the post of Secretary, he was eventually elected as the President of this union. He has also been at the helm of the Maharashtra Rajya Rashtriya Kamgar Sangh since 1996. He also led the Mazagaon Dock, Mahindra and Mahindra Union, etc. He also influenced the labour movement by carrying out agreements for increment in salaries of the workers in all these industries.

References

External links
 The Shivsena

Shiv Sena politicians
Living people
Maharashtra MLAs 1999–2004
1972 births
Nationalist Congress Party politicians from Maharashtra